Yeshiva Atlanta (YA) was the first Jewish secondary school in Metro Atlanta, Georgia.  It was established on August 28, 1970, and it ran until July 1, 2014, when it was merged with Greenfield Hebrew Academy primary school to form the Atlanta Jewish Academy, a comprehensive Pre-K through 12th Grade School.

The final campus was in Doraville.

See also
History of the Jews in Atlanta

References

External links
 

Private high schools in DeKalb County, Georgia
2014 disestablishments in Georgia (U.S. state)
Educational institutions disestablished in 2014